Protoblepharon is a genus of flashlight fishes known from the Pacific Ocean from around the Cook Islands (P. rosenblatti) and off of eastern Taiwan (P. mccoskeri).

Species
There are currently two recognized species in this genus:
 Protoblepharon mccoskeri H. C. Ho & G. D. Johnson, 2012 (Taiwanese flashlightfish)
 Protoblepharon rosenblatti C. C. Baldwin, G. D. Johnson & Paxton, 1997 (Cook Islands flashlightfish)

References

Anomalopidae
Marine fish genera